Sam Twiston-Davies is a British National Hunt racing jockey. He was the retained jockey of ten-times British jump racing Champion Trainer Paul Nicholls. He won the 2015 Queen Mother Champion Chase on Dodging Bullets. His father is trainer Nigel Twiston-Davies.

Career
His first Cheltenham Festival winner was Baby Run in the 2010 St James's Place Foxhunter Chase. He made his Grand National debut in 2010. He came 5th on Hello Bud, who was trained by his father.

In the 2010/11 season he won the Conditional Jockeys championship.

His first century was in the 2013/14 season when he had 115 winners from 774 rides.

Paul Nicholls announced on 28 April 2014 that Sam would be his number one principal jockey in the 2014/15 season.

In the 2015 Cheltenham Festival he had a day two double, the Queen Mother Champion Chase with Dodging Bullets and with	Aux Ptits Soins in the Coral Cup.

In 2016 he had double on day one of the Cheltenham Festival with wins in the Fred Winter Juvenile Novices' Handicap Hurdle and Champion Bumper. On Friday he won the Grand Annual Chase for his third win at the 2016 Cheltenham Festival. In April 2016 he won the Scottish Grand National on Vincente.

In April 2017 he won the Scottish Grand National again on Vincente.

In May 2018 Sam announced he would become freelance.

In 2023 he rode well on The Real Whacker and in turn won the Brown Advisory Novices' Chase (Grade 1) race.

Cheltenham Festival winners

Major wins
 Punchestown Gold Cup - (1) - Clan des Obeaux (2021)

References

Sam Twiston-Davies becomes number one jockey for Nicholls

1992 births
Living people
People from Cotswold District
British people of English descent
British people of Welsh descent
British people of Irish descent
English jockeys
Lester Award winners
Sam Twiston-Davies